Józef Pińkowski (17 April 1929 – 8 November 2000) was a Polish Communist politician who served as 51st Prime Minister of Poland from 1980 to 1981.

By profession Pińkowski was an economist. In 1971 he became a member of the central committee of the PZPR.   Between 1971 and 1974 he was First Deputy Chairman of the Planning Commission of the Ministerial Council.   Between September 1980 and February 1981, during the early years of the Solidarity movement, he served with some success as Prime Minister of Poland under the party leadership of Stanisław Kania.

1929 births
2000 deaths
People from Siedlce
People from Lublin Voivodeship (1919–1939)
Members of the Politburo of the Polish United Workers' Party
Prime Ministers of the Polish People's Republic
Members of the Polish Sejm 1969–1972
Members of the Polish Sejm 1972–1976
Members of the Polish Sejm 1976–1980
Members of the Polish Sejm 1980–1985
Recipients of the Order of the Banner of Work